Aaraadhana is a 1977 Indian Malayalam film, directed by Madhu. The film stars Madhu, Sharada, Vidhubala and Sukumari in the lead roles. The film has musical score by K. J. Joy.

Cast
 
Madhu as Anand 
Sharada as Sharadha 
Vidhubala as Radha 
Sukumari 
Jose Prakash 
Prem Prakash 
Prema 
Sankaradi 
Baby Sumathi 
Baby Vandana
Neyyaattinkara Komalam
Reena

Soundtrack
The music was composed by K. J. Joy and the lyrics were written by Bichu Thirumala.

References

External links
 

1977 films
1970s Malayalam-language films